The Shakey's V-League teams present all the teams that have participated in the Shakey's V-League from 2004 to 2016. The league was renamed Premier Volleyball League (PVL) in 2017. The men's division became the Spikers' Turf in 2015 and folded into the PVL as its men's division in 2017.

Women's division

Collegiate
  – Sherwin Meneses
  – Obet Javier
  – Anusorn "Tai" Bundit / Roger Gorayeb / Parley Tupas / Charo Soriano
  – Michael Cariño
  – Shaq Delos Santos / Ernesto Pamiliar
  De La Salle University-Dasmarinas Lady Patriots – Raymond Ramirez
  – Brian Esquivel
  – Emil Lontoc
  – Ramil de Jesus
  – Edjet Mabbayad / Roger Gorayeb
 
  PUP Lady Radicals – Wendell Padilla
  San Beda Lady Red Spikers – Nemesio Gavino
  – Roger Gorayeb / Clint Malazo
   – Jordan Paca
  St. Louis University Lady Navigators – Henry Fuentes
  – Achilles "Boy" Paril 
  University of Batangas Lady Brahmans – Ahmed Aylion
  – Sammy Acaylar
  – Francis Vicente
  – Jerry Yee
  University of San Carlos Lady Warriors – Norvie Labuga
  – Grace Antigua
  – Roger Banzuela
  – Emilio "Kungfu" Reyes Jr.

Corporate/Club
  Baguio Summer Spikers – Clarissa Tolentino
  BaliPure Purest Water Defenders – Anusorn Bundit
  Bureau of Customs Transformers – Sherwin Meneses
  Cagayan Valley Lady Rising Suns – Ernesto Pamilar
  Davao Lady Agilas – Shane Alagao
  Iriga Lady Oragons - Elvis Pabilonia
  Kia Forte – Oliver Almadro
  Laoag Power Smashers – Ernesto Pamilar
  Maynilad Water Dragons  
  Meralco – Brian Esquivel
  Smart/Maynilad Net Spikers  
  PLDT – Roger Gorayeb
  Pocari Sweat Lady Warriors - Rommel Abella
  Philippine Air Force Jet Spikers - Jasper Jimenez
  Philippine Army Lady Troopers – Emilio "Kungfu" Reyes Jr.
  Philippine Coast Guard Lady Dolphins – Butch Ordon
  Philippine Navy Lady Sailors – Zenaida "Nene" Ybanez-Chavez
  Philippine National Police Lady Patrollers – Argie Dave
  Sandugo/SSC-R Lady Conquerors – Roger Gorayeb
  Fourbees-Perpetual Help – Sammy Acaylar

Special teams
  PSC Lady Legends — Ramon Suzara
  Smart All-Stars – Roger Gorayeb
  Shakey's All-Stars – Ernesto Pamilar
  Team Palaban All-Stars
  Team Puso All-Stars
  Malaysia Club Team (MAS Club) – Mohd. Shaili Sukor
  Vietsovpetro – Aleksey Diva

Men's division
  Instituto Estetico Manila Volley Masters – Ernesto Balubar
  Systema Active Smashers – Arnold Laniog
  Rizal Technological University Blue Thunder – George Pascua
  – Florentino "Kid" Santos

References

External links
 www.v-league.ph - Official website
 www.vleague.tk
 www.spikersturf.com/ - Official website

Shakey's V-League